Parectatosia robusta is a species of beetle in the family Cerambycidae. It was described by Per Olof Christopher Aurivillius in 1911. It is known from Borneo, Malaysia, and the Philippines.

References

Desmiphorini
Beetles described in 1911